Jaskaran Singh (born 19 September 2002) is an English cricketer. He made his first-class cricket debut for Kent County Cricket Club against Sussex on 11 July 2021 in the 2021 County Championship following a member of the county's First XI squad testing positive for COVID-19 which required the players involved in the county's previous match to all self-isolate. As a result, a number of Second XI players or "homegrown prospects" were drafted into the squad and made their senior debuts for the county. Singh took four top-order wickets in Sussex's first innings on debut, finishing with innings with four wickets at the cost of 51 runs (4/51) from 11 overs.

Singh was born at Denmark Hill in London in 2001 and educated at Wilmington Academy close to Dartford, Kent. He plays club cricket for Bexley Cricket Club in the Kent Cricket League. He was part of Kent's age-group teams from the age of nine and a member of the Kent cricket academy in 2021. He first played for the county's Second XI in 2019. He made his Twenty20 debut on 21 June 2022, for Kent in the 2022 T20 Blast.

References

External links
 

2002 births
Living people
English cricketers
Kent cricketers
People from Denmark Hill
British Asian cricketers
British sportspeople of Indian descent